The Adventures of Jimmy is a 1950 American short experimental film directed by, and starring, James Broughton. It was Broughton's second film as sole director, following Mother's Day (1948), and was filmed by Art in Cinema founder Frank Stauffacher with an original musical score by Weldon Kees.

Plot
Jimmy (Broughton) is a woodsman who lives in a remote, mountain cabin. Several times he travels to the city in search of a wife, each time changing his appearance and clothing somewhat in hopes of improving his chances.

Legacy

The film reportedly combined elements of farce and slapstick with the emerging experimental film genre, and as such would have been considerably lighter fare than Broughton's prior collaboration with Sidney Peterson, The Potted Psalm (1946) or his own Mother's Day. Although Broughton was no longer including it in his touring film programs by the late 1970s, at that time The Adventures of Jimmy was still available for rental from the Film-Makers' Cooperative and Canyon Cinema. At some point the title was withdrawn from circulation, and The Adventures of Jimmy has become a very difficult title to see; regrettable, as it contains the film score by Weldon Kees. Kees was primarily a poet, painter and short story author whose music making is only sparsely documented.

See also
 List of avant-garde films of the 1950s

References

External links
 

1950 short films
1950s avant-garde and experimental films
1950s American films
1950s English-language films
American avant-garde and experimental films
American black-and-white films
American short films